The 6th edition of the Tour of Norway road cycling race took place from 18 to 22 May 2016. The race was part of UCI Europe Tour in category 2.HC.

Route

Classification leadership

Final standings

General classification

Points classification

Mountains classification

Young riders classification (U23)

Team classification

References

External links
 Official website

Tour of Norway
Tour of Norway
2016 in Norwegian sport